St George & St Shenouda Coptic Orthodox Church (Coptic:  // transliteration: ti.eklyseya en.remenkimi en.orthodoxos ente fi.ethowab Gewargios nem fi.ethowab shenouty) is the second Coptic Orthodox church that was established in Jersey City, New Jersey. It is one of over 200 Coptic Orthodox Churches in the United States.

History
Coptic Orthodox Christians, who adhere to an ancient Christian faith rooted in Egypt in the first century, have established a stronghold throughout New Jersey over the last several decades. The first Coptic Orthodox Church in the United States was St. Mark’s in Jersey City, which was founded in 1970 by Egyptian immigrants, and the congregations have since grown in allowing 15 other parishes in New Jersey alone, including St. Mark's Church in the same region of Jersey City.

The large influx of Copts in New Jersey can be attributed to their persecution in Egypt, in addition to those who emigrate seeking education and financial opportunities. Currently, there are more than 30,000 Copts in Jersey City specifically. St. George & St. Shenouda Church was first founded in 1973, although the actual date of incorporation was January 1974.

Priests
Fr. David Bebawy - (201) 332-8369
Fr. Makarius Sawirus - (201) 332-8369
Fr. Anthony Basily - (201) 332-8369
Fr. Thomas Nashed - (201) 332-8369
Fr. David Habib - (201) 332-8369
Fr. John Ibrahim - (201) 332-8369

Expansion
The year 1977 marked the first pastoral visit by Pope Shenouda III to the US and Canada, including both of Jersey City's two oldest churches (the only ones at the time). There are currently about 1500 Coptic families served by St. George & St. Shenouda Church alone with several others belonging to different church congregations throughout northern New Jersey in particular.

See also
Coptic Orthodox Church
Seat of the Coptic Orthodox Pope of Alexandria
Coptic architecture
Coptic Cairo
Coptic Orthodox Church in North America
Coptic Orthodox Church in Canada
Coptic Orthodox Church in the United States
List of Coptic Orthodox Churches in the United States
St. George Coptic Orthodox Church (Philadelphia)
St. Mark Coptic Orthodox Church (Jersey City, New Jersey)
St. Mary & St. Antonios Coptic Orthodox Church (Ridgewood, Queens)
St. George Coptic Orthodox Church (Brooklyn)
St. Abraam Coptic Orthodox Church (Woodbury, New York)

References

External links
 The official website of St. George & St. Shenouda Coptic Orthodox Church
 The Coptic Orthodox Archdiocese of North America
 Directory & Statistics on Coptic Orthodox Churches in North America

Egyptian-American history
Coptic Orthodox churches in New Jersey
Churches in Jersey City, New Jersey
Christian organizations established in 1974
Oriental Orthodox congregations established in the 20th century
Churches in Hudson County, New Jersey